Ji Seung-ho (born 1968) is a former professional tennis player from South Korea.

Biography
Ji won a bronze medal in the men's doubles at the 1990 Asian Games and was a gold medalist in the same event at the 1991 Summer Universiade.

All of his ATP Tour main draw appearances came at his home tournament, the Korea Open in Seoul. He had his best performance at the 1991 Korea Open, where he had a win over Jim Grabb and with partner Chang Eui-jong made the semi-finals of the doubles, beating the top seeded pair Grant Connell and Glenn Michibata en route.

He played in three Davis Cup ties for South Korea, across 1991 and 1992.

See also
List of South Korea Davis Cup team representatives

References

External links
 
 
 

1968 births
Living people
South Korean male tennis players
Universiade medalists in tennis
Tennis players at the 1990 Asian Games
Medalists at the 1990 Asian Games
Asian Games bronze medalists for South Korea
Asian Games medalists in tennis
Date of birth missing (living people)
Universiade gold medalists for South Korea
Medalists at the 1991 Summer Universiade
Medalists at the 1993 Summer Universiade